Romiley is a village in the Metropolitan Borough of Stockport, Greater Manchester, England. Historically part of Cheshire, it borders Marple, Bredbury and Woodley. At the 2011 census, the Romiley ward, which includes Compstall, Bredbury Green and a large part of Bredbury, had a population of 14,139.

History

For centuries, it was an agricultural area until the late Victorian era, when it became a residential area with a small district centre.

There are four primary schools: Romiley Primary School, Bredbury Green Primary School, St Christopher's Catholic Primary School and Greave Primary School (which is on the border with Woodley). Secondary education is provided by Werneth School and Harrytown Catholic High School.

Romiley also has its own theatre, the Forum Theatre.  This is a building owned by Stockport Council but, since 2003, has been managed by NK Theatre Arts, a registered charity which provides all-inclusive performing arts workshops for children, young people and adults. The theatre is also used by many other local community groups in Stockport.

Geography
Romiley's surroundings are rural, although it is a suburb, with fields to the north, south and east. Compstall, between Romiley and Marple, is home to the Etherow Country Park which is the largest country park in Stockport.

Transport
It is served by Romiley railway station on the Hope Valley Line from Sheffield to Manchester Piccadilly. Services run westbound to Manchester Piccadilly, either via Bredbury or Woodley; eastbound trains travel either to Rose Hill Marple or to Marple and beyond to New Mills Central and Sheffield.

Romiley is served by several bus services. The most regular services run on a Stockport circular route to Bredbury and Portwood (383 anticlockwise) and to Marple and Offerton (384 clockwise). There is also an hourly 382 service, which runs from Stockport to/from Woodley, via Romiley.

Conservation areas 
Romiley contains four conservation areas, a designation made by the local council to protect locations which have special architectural or historical character. It helps reduce traffic, preserve wildlife and important landscapes, and restricts making changes which affect the look of the area such as changing front doors, roofing, facades or windows. They are:
The conservation area covers 0.39 hectares and contains 12 households.
It comprises farmlands, a 17th-century farmhouse, outbuildings and Victorian walled garden, and a 16th-century chapel, forming an oasis of peace and tranquility, surrounded on three sides by ancient woodlands and the River Goyt which flows alongside.
 Church Lane (1996, extended in 2006). Church Lane Conservation Area is essentially a late 19th-century railway suburb, overlaying the lanes and fields of a former agricultural area. It developed as a railway suburb, following the opening of Romiley railway station in 1862. However, it has the form and character of a village or earlier community as the area is focused around the landmark church of St Chad (1864–66).
The conservation area covers 2.31 hectares and contains 48 households.

A further conservation area adjoins Romiley at Hatherlow in Bredbury.

Notable people
 

Arthur Lockwood (1903–1933), cricketer

See also

Listed buildings in Bredbury and Romiley

References

External links
Romiley Primary School

Areas of Greater Manchester
Geography of the Metropolitan Borough of Stockport